The Tugan LJW7 Gannet, also known later as the Wackett Gannet after its designer Lawrence Wackett, was a small twin-engined airliner built by Tugan Aircraft in Australia in the 1930s.  It was the first Australian-designed aircraft to enter series production. It was also the first Australian-designed and built aircraft to be taken on strength by the Royal Australian Air Force.

Design and development
The Gannet was a strut-braced, high-wing monoplane of conventional design, with twin engines mounted in nacelles on the wings. The undercarriage was of fixed, tailwheel configuration with divided main units. The wings were of wooden construction, skinned in plywood, and the fuselage was built from welded steel covered in fabric. The prototype Gannet underwent flight testing in October 1935, and was destroyed in a crash shortly thereafter. The pilot and passengers perished in the ensuing fire, but despite this, the Gannet entered series production.

The type was operated by Butler Air Transport between Sydney and Broken Hill and at least one flew with Ansett Airways in 1943. RAAF Gannets saw service as survey aircraft between 1935 and 1942 when they were converted into air ambulances for the newly-formed No.2 Air Ambulance Unit. The last RAAF Gannets were scrapped in 1946.

Operators

 Ansett Airways
 Butler Air Transport
 Royal Australian Air Force
 Western and Southern Provincial Airlines

Specifications

See also

Notes

References

 
 
  
 
 
 

1930s Australian airliners